Buurgplaatz (alternate names: Buergplaatz, Burrigplatz, Burgplatz, Buergplaz zu Huldang) is a hill in the commune of Troisvierges, in northern Luxembourg.

In 1952 the Institut national de l'information géographique et forestière declared Buurgplaatz the highest point in Luxembourg.

The declaration plaque on the summit remains and Buurgplaatz may still be erroneously considered the highest point in Luxembourg.

References
 Climbers web site

Mountains under 1000 metres
Mountains and hills of the Ardennes (Luxembourg)
Mountains and hills of the Eifel
Troisvierges